Rakel Surlien (born 10 February 1944) is a Norwegian judge, civil servant and politician for the Centre Party.

Biography 
Surlien was the Minister of Environmental Affairs from 1983 to 1986 during Kåre Willoch's second term as prime minister. From 1987 to she was a judge at Borgarting Court of Appeal in Oslo. She was Director of the Independent Judicial Commission, reporting to the High Commissioner of Bosnia and Herzegovina 2001–2004. Thereafter she was a judge at Borgarting until 2016. During the same period she was appointed an ad hoc member of the Efta Competition Agency.

References 

1944 births
Living people
Ministers of Climate and the Environment of Norway
Centre Party (Norway) politicians
Norwegian civil servants
Norwegian judges
Women government ministers of Norway
20th-century Norwegian women politicians
20th-century Norwegian politicians
Norwegian Association for Women's Rights people